Chris Walsh (May 20, 1951 – May 2, 2018) was an American architect and politician.

Born in New York City, New York, Walsh received his degree in architect from Rhode Island School of Design and was an architect. Walsh lived in Framingham, Massachusetts. Walsh served in the Massachusetts House of Representatives from 2010 until his death and was a Democrat. Walsh died from cancer on May 2, 2018.

References

1951 births
2018 deaths
Politicians from New York City
People from Framingham, Massachusetts
Rhode Island School of Design alumni
Architects from Massachusetts
Democratic Party members of the Massachusetts House of Representatives
21st-century American politicians
Deaths from cancer in Massachusetts